Bhutanitis mansfieldi, the Mansfield's three-tailed swallowtail, is a species of butterfly in the family Papilionidae. It is endemic to China.

References

External links

Pteron-world.com: photos of Bhutanitis species  — , with latin binomial names.
TOLweb.org: Taxonomic discussion of Bhutanitis mansfieldi — with photograph.

M
Butterflies of Asia
Endemic fauna of China
Butterflies described in 1939
Taxa named by Norman Denbigh Riley
Taxonomy articles created by Polbot